Mohammed Hamudi Bajaber (born 15 March 2003) is a Kenyan football player who turns out for Kenyan Premier League side Nairobi City Stars.

Career

Bajaber is a part of Starfield Academy in Parklands. In August 2021 it was reported that he attended trials at Danish top tier side FC Midtjylland.

In February 2022 he joined Nairobi City Stars on a short-term loan deal from Starfield Academy to the end of the season after spending weeks training with the club.

He earned his Premier League debut on 15 May 2022 in Ruaraka against Tusker, and earned his first start in Thika against AFC Leopards on 6 June 2022.

References

Living people
2003 births
Kenyan footballers
Nairobi City Stars players
Kenyan Premier League players